Statistics of Nemzeti Bajnokság I for the 1916–17 season.

Overview
It was contested by 12 teams, and MTK Hungária FC won the championship.

League standings

Results

References
Hungary - List of final tables (RSSSF)

1916-17
1916–17 in Hungarian football
1916–17 in European association football leagues